Events from the year 1907 in Denmark.

Incumbents
 Monarch – Frederick VIII
 Prime minister – J. C. Christensen

Events

Culture

Music
 30 November  Carl Nielsen's String Quartet No. 4 is for the first time performed in public in the Odd Fellows Mansion.

Births
 4 July – Henning Holck-Larsen, engineer, co-founder of Indian engineering company Larsen & Toubro (died 2003)
 21 October – Nina Stroganova, a prima ballerina (died in New York, 1994)
 4 November – Henry Heerup, painter, sculptor (died 1993)

Deaths
 16 January – Frederik Georg Emil Rostrup (born 1831)
 24 January – Vilhelm Dahlerup, architect (born 1836)
 10 April  Emilie West, educator (born 1844)
 28 May – Valdemar Tofte, violinist (born 1832)
 14 November – August Ferdinand Michael van Mehren, philologist (died 1822)
 22 November  – Ditlev Torm, businessman (born 1836)
 25 November – Ludvig Mylius-Erichsen, arctic explorer, author and ethnologist (born 1872)

References

 
Denmark
Years of the 20th century in Denmark
1900s in Denmark
Denmark